James Hagan may refer to:

 James Hagan (bishop) (1904–1976), English Roman Catholic bishop
 James Hagan (Confederate colonel) (1822–1901), United States Army captain and Confederate States Army colonel
 James B. Hagan (1923–1988), member of the Ohio House of Representatives
 James E. Hagan (1902–1965), American businessman and politician in the Massachusetts House of Representatives
 Jim Hagan (born 1956), Northern Irish former professional footballer and manager
 Jim Hagan (basketball) (born 1936), American basketball player
 Jimmy Hagan (1918–1998), English football player and manager